Edward Martin Corrie (born 21 February 1988) is a British former and retired tennis player.

Career
Corrie played collegiately at the University of Texas at Austin from 2007 to 2011. He made his debut on the ITF Men's Circuit in 2005, and since then has won 27 Futures tournaments: seven in singles and twenty in doubles. He has also won two ATP Challenger doubles tournaments.

He was primarily a doubles player until achieving success in singles in 2013, earning him a wildcard to the main draw of the 2013 Queen's Club Championships, losing his first round match 4–6, 6–7(1) to Sergiy Stakhovsky, ranked 116th.

Corrie announced his retirement from tennis in 2018.

Career finals

Singles: 22 (7–15)

Doubles: 39 (24–15)

References

External links
 
 
 
 LTA profile

1988 births
Living people
English male tennis players
British male tennis players
Tennis people from Hertfordshire
Texas Longhorns men's tennis players